East Leroy is an unincorporated community in Calhoun County, Michigan, United States. East Leroy has a post office with ZIP code 49051.

History
David C. Fish became the first resident of East Leroy in 1836, though Ira Case had bought land in the area the previous year. Fish's wife named the community Leroy after the couple's first son, Leroy Fish. A marsh in the area split the community into East and West Leroy. The post office opened on June 28, 1852, under the name Secillia; William H. Gilles was its first postmaster. The post office closed in 1871 but reopened in 1872, and it was renamed East Leroy in 1874.

References

Unincorporated communities in Calhoun County, Michigan
Populated places established in 1836
Unincorporated communities in Michigan
1836 establishments in Michigan Territory